"Good Girls Go Bad" is a song by American pop band Cobra Starship with guest vocals by Leighton Meester. It was the first single released from their third studio album, Hot Mess. The song was released digitally through iTunes on May 11, 2009. On May 8, 2009, "Good Girls Go Bad" made its radio debut on KIIS-FM with Ryan Seacrest's show.

The song was produced by former American Idol judge Kara DioGuardi and Kevin Rudolf.
The song went on to become Cobra Starship and Leighton Meester's first US hit and top 10, peaking at number seven on the Billboard Hot 100 and was certified double-Platinum by the Recording Industry Association of America, denoting over 2 million copies sold in the United States. The song received heavy airplay in Canada as well, debuting at 21 on Canada's radio airplay chart "Canadian Hit 30" week ending July 25, 2009. The song also debuted on Radio 1 in the UK in September 2009. The song was licensed in various media.
 
Some of the official remixes also feature rapper Flo Rida.

Production

The band was first offered to work with Kara DioGuardi in 2009, just as DioGuardi was becoming an American Idol judge. Vocalist Gabe Saporta explained,

We got offered to work with Kara right as she was becoming an American Idol judge. We didn't know who she was. She didn't know who we were. We got hooked up with her. I'm like, 'Who is this person?' She's like, 'Who's this annoying band?' But we got in the room, and it was like magic, and we wrote the song in 15 minutes. It's, like, the best song on our album.

Fifteen minutes after the creation of the hook for the song, the entire track was done. On April 27, 2009, it was announced Gossip Girl star Leighton Meester would be featured. Lead singer Gabe Saporta had wanted Meester to be featured in the song because "it's already kind of her character in Gossip Girl, like the perfect girl with the bad streak." Once Meester heard "Good Girls Go Bad", she took an immediate liking to it. "I thought, 'I need to get on that!' It totally is my sound too. Really fun to dance to it. Very edgy and cool".

Live performances
Cobra Starship has performed the song live with Nicole Scherzinger at 36th People's Choice Awards, and Paulina Rubio at Los Premios MTV Latinoamérica 2009. On November 18, 2009, Leighton Meester performed the song for the first time ever at the Flagship Store of American Eagle Outfitters. On November 24, 2009, Cobra Starship, alongside Leighton Meester, performed the song for the first time ever on the OP Presents Tour at the Nokia Theatre.

Composition
"Good Girls Go Bad" is in A Minor and has a vocal range between A3 through C5. The song moves at 126 bpm and is set in 4/4 time. The song maintains a sequence of A minor-C-G-F.

Critical reception
Billboard reviewer Michael Menachem made comment on the song:

"Good Girls Go Bad has the magic to launch the members of Cobra Starship into superstardom. The New York dance-punk band powers the single from its third album, "Hot Mess"—stylish enough for a stroll along the boardwalk and rowdy enough for the club. The guy anthem is sweetened with "Gossip Girl" star Leighton Meester's first musical effort, adding some sass to match Gabe Saporta's energetic vocals. The contagious hook and chorus have a lively group component where the co-eds battle in a call-and-response sing-off. With a similar appeal to No Doubt's "Hey Baby"—minus the reggae but with an accelerated jolt of electro—Cobra Starship has arrived."

Bill Lamb of About.com gave the song  stars commenting on its danceable sound and that it sounds good on the radio, catchy and sticks in the brain, and that Leighton Meester adds some spice but disregards the silly lyrics. Overall, he thinks that "This is one of the most deliberately polished pop singles of the year."

However, Mayer Nissim of Digital Spy gave the song one star out of five, saying it is "one of the most boorish, witless singles in recent memory. The music is bad enough, its sub-GaGa production bearing all the class of a street-bought 'Romex' watch. Somehow though, the lyrics manage to take the song into a whole new world of awful, reading like a passion-free imbecile manifesto." According to the review, the song is likely to be the "emotionally and artistically most bankrupt pop song" of 2009.

Music video

A music video for the song was shot on May 3, 2009, in New York City by director Kai Regan and it premiered on Monday, June 29, 2009. Leighton Meester shot the clip while she was in town for the 2009 Costume Institute Gala. The concept of the video is that Gabe Saporta runs an underground speakeasy, complete with shelves of booze, gambling tables and a dance floor. The band is in charge of the above-ground deli that acts as a front operation to hide the debauchery within. To gain access to the illegal club, patrons must order the correct sandwich and proceed down a staircase. Meester and Victoria Asher — who has a codename of Johnny Outlaw — the band's keytarist, exchange several text messages while in the club concerning a package hidden in the DJ's booth. At one point, Meester makes references to her role of Blair Waldorf in Gossip Girl by texting "xoxo". Meester retrieves the package and shortly after, the club is raided by police, and the speakeasy operators - including Saporta - are all arrested. At the end of the video, it is revealed that Asher and Meester were undercover agents involved in a sting operation. The video was nominated at the 2009 MTV Video Music Awards in the category Best Pop Video, but lost to "Womanizer" by Britney Spears.

Ryland's alter-ego, Guy Ripley makes an appearance. During his appearance a reference is made to "The City Is at War" video.

Chart performance
The song debuted on the Billboard Hot 100 chart of May 30, 2009, at number 76, becoming the first entry of both artists in the chart. On June 20, 2009, the song re-entered on chart at number 91. On August 15, 2009, the song entered the top 10 at number 10, becoming the first Top 10 of both artists in the chart. The song eventually peaked at number 7.

Media usage
As a reference to Leighton Meester's vocals, the track was used on Gossip Girl for several scenes where her character, Blair Waldorf, is portrayed on the episode "The Freshmen". The song was also used in Greek's "Friend or Foe?" (renamed as "ZBZ Girls Go Bad"), in the season 4 premiere of Ugly Betty, and in the episode "Homecoming and Coming Home" of Hart of Dixie. It was also featured briefly on the trailer for the 2010 comedy You Again and appears in Watch Dogs and Boyhood. Its most recent usage was in the opening sequence of the season 16 Law & Order: Special Victims Unit episode "Granting Immunity".

Track listings
UK CD single
 "Good Girls Go Bad" – 3:17

UK digital EP
 "Good Girls Go Bad" – 3:17
 "Good Girls Go Bad" (Suave Suarez on Pleasure Ryland remix) – 3:58
 "Good Girls Go Bad" (Cash Cash remix) – 4:39

German CD single
 "Good Girls Go Bad" – 3:17
 "Good Girls Go Bad" (featuring Flo Rida and DJ Frank E) – 3:22

German CD maxi
 "Good Girls Go Bad" – 3:17
 "Good Girls Go Bad" (Frank E remix featuring Flo Rida) – 3:22
 "Good Girls Go Bad" (MoAzza remix) – 4:08
 "Good Girls Go Bad" (Funk Generation Club remix)
 "Good Girls Go Bad" (Suave Suarez on Pleasure Ryland remix) – 3:58
 "Good Girls Go Bad" (music video)

Charts and certifications

Weekly charts

Year-end charts

Certifications

Release history

References

2009 singles
Cobra Starship songs
Leighton Meester songs
Songs written by Kara DioGuardi
Songs written by Jacob Kasher
Songs written by Kevin Rudolf
Gossip Girl
2009 songs
Fueled by Ramen singles